Rosa Le Seur, married name Rosa Junkermann, (1846 – 1920) was a German stage actress and soprano.

Life 
Born in Berlin, Le Seur received her singing lessons from the well-known song composer Ferdinand Gumbert. She worked as the first soubrette and from 1866 was engaged at the Berlin Viktoriatheater, at the court theatre in Meiningen, as well as in Bremen, Nuremberg, Amsterdam, Stuttgart and Breslau, and her most popular roles included Die schöne Galathée, La belle Hélène, Boulotte in Barbe-bleue), La Grande-Duchesse de Gérolstein, Kleine Handschumacherin in La Vie parisienne etc., thus in operettas by Jacques Offenbach.

In Stuttgart, where no operettas were given at that time, she was engaged for 17 years for role of the first Lustspielsoubretten and Salondame.

Her sons from her marriage with August Junkermann, Hans and Fritz also devoted themselves to acting, as did her stepson Karl Junkermann and his wife Anna Junkermann.

References

Further reading 
 Ludwig Eisenberg: Rosa Le Seur In Großes biographisches Lexikon der deutschen Bühne im XIX. Jahrhundert. Paul List, Leipzig 1903,  (daten.digitale-sammlungen.de.

German stage actresses
German sopranos
1846 births
1920 deaths
Actresses from Berlin